The Microsail is a trailerable sailboat, that was designed by American Gary Mull as a Micro Class racer and first built in 1980.

Production
The boat was originally built by Jeanneau in France for French Micro Cup racing. It was later built by a number of companies, including C.N. Loire up until 2000. After 2000 it was only available as a kit for amateur construction until Construction Navale Franck Roy commenced building the design again in 2007.

Design
The Microsail is a small racing keelboat, built predominantly of fiberglass. It has a fractional sloop rig, an transom-hung rudder and a lifting fin keel. It displaces  and carries  of ballast.

See also
List of sailing boat types

References

External links
Photo of a Microsail

Keelboats
1980s sailboat type designs
Sailing yachts
Trailer sailers
Sailboat types built in the United States
Sailboat type designs by Gary Mull
Sailboat types built by Jeanneau
Sailboat types built by Construction Navale Franck Roy
Sailboat types built by C.N. Loire